The Whipple Expedition (1853–1854) was led by Lieutenant Amiel Weeks Whipple and tasked with conducting a survey from Fort Smith, Arkansas, to Los Angeles, California, along the 35th parallel north. The expedition lasted for nine months and traveled .

References

Bibliography
 

Arizona Territory